Popular Science Italia is the Italian language edition of the American magazine Popular Science. It has been published in Rome, Italy, since 2014 by Kekoa Publishing under the direction of Francesco Maria Avitto.

References

External links
Popular Science Italia

2014 establishments in Italy
Magazines published in Rome
Italian-language magazines
Magazines established in 2014
Popular science magazines